Justin A. Orenduff (born May 27, 1983) is an American former professional baseball right-handed pitcher. He previously played Minor League Baseball in the Los Angeles Dodgers organization.

Career
As a freshman at George Washington University he made 28 appearances and was 10-2 with one save and a 1.68 ERA, ranking second in the Atlantic 10 Conference. He transferred to Virginia Commonwealth University for his sophomore season and won Baseball America second team All-American honors and All-Colonial Athletic Association accolades. He pitched for Team U.S.A. during the summer of 2003 in the Pan American Games. He was part of a strong pitching rotation that included Jered Weaver and Justin Verlander. He pitched a shutout in the medal round against Brazil to lead the U.S. team into the semi-finals.

Orenduff was selected by the Los Angeles Dodgers in the 1st round of the 2004 MLB Draft and assigned to rookie-class Ogden Raptors for the conclusion of the season.

He split the 2005 season between Single-A Vero Beach Dodgers and Double-A Jacksonville Suns. He was a combined 10-5 with a 3.19 ERA for the two teams and was named to the Florida State League All-Star team.

He was ranked as the 14th best prospect in the Dodgers system after completing the 2006 season for Jacksonville.

Orenduff struggled at AAA Las Vegas at the start of the 2007 season and returned to Jacksonville, where his numbers improved. He then pitched for the Peoria Saguaros of the Arizona Fall League after the 2007 season. He returned to Las Vegas for the 2008 season.

Orenduff was designated for assignment and removed from the 40 man roster on March 8, to make room for Manny Ramirez. After spending several months in A ball with the Inland Empire 66ers of San Bernardino, Orenduff retired on May 24, 2009.

He decided to end his retirement in 2011 and returned to the Dodgers, where he was assigned to the Rancho Cucamonga Quakes. He appeared in nine games with the Quakes, with an 8.74 ERA and was released on July 14, 2011.

References

External links

1983 births
Living people
Baseball pitchers
Baseball players at the 2003 Pan American Games
Baseball players from Maryland
Inland Empire 66ers of San Bernardino players
Jacksonville Suns players
Las Vegas 51s players
Ogden Raptors players
Pan American Games medalists in baseball
Pan American Games silver medalists for the United States
Peoria Saguaros players
Rancho Cucamonga Quakes players
Sportspeople from Hagerstown, Maryland
Surprise Rafters players
United States national baseball team players
Vero Beach Dodgers players
Medalists at the 2003 Pan American Games